Madonna with the Christ Child Reading is a c.1494–1498 oil on panel painting by Pinturicchio, now in the North Carolina Museum of Art in Raleigh. It is a simplified autograph version of Madonna of Peace by the same artist.

References

Paintings of the Madonna and Child by Pinturicchio
1490s paintings
Paintings in the collection of the North Carolina Museum of Art